Jenny Zhang (born 22 June 1987) is a Chinese actress and singer. She is noted for her roles in the television series Palace II (2012) and Story of Yanxi Palace (2018).

Early life and education
Zhang was born in Chengdu, Sichuan on June 22, 1987. She graduated from Beijing Film Academy, majoring in acting.

Career
In 2006, Zhang won the champion of Looking for Zi Ling, a Hunan Television talent show. At that time, Zhang entered into the entertainment industry.

Zhang rose to fame after portraying Wang Ziling in the television series Dreams Link (2007), a romantic television series adaptation based on the novel of the same name by Chiung Yao, and she won the Rising Star Award at the Beijing Television Film and Television Awards. That same year, she made her film debut in The Summer of Our Graduation, playing Xiao Xia.

In 2009, Zhang co-starred with Ming Dao in the television series Smile in My Heart and won the Best Popularity Award at the Entertainment Star List.

Zhang starred as Zhang Xiaorou, reuniting her with co-star Lan Cheng Long, in the 2010 romance series Strands of Love. She also acted in the shenmo television series Ghost Catcher - Legend of Beauty and modern drama From Love.

In 2011, Zhang starred in the historical romance drama Allure Snow, she received positive reviews. She also starred in the period drama Mother's Love, and had a supporting role in the remake of My Fair Princess.

In 2012, Zhang starred in the palace-themed drama Palace II. The same year, she starred in the metropolitan drama City Lover.

In 2013, Zhang starred as Wu Susu in the historical dramaThe Patriot Yue Fei, alongside Huang Xiaoming. She also starred in modern romance drama Flowers of Pinellia Ternata and war drama The Ultimate Conquest .

In 2014, Zhang portrayed the beautiful Sun Shangxiang in the costume web series San Guo Re. The same year, she was cast in the adaptation of Jin Yong's wuxia novel Ode to Gallantry as the female lead Ding Dang.

In 2016, Zhang starred in the modern melodrama Love Me, Don't Go.

In 2017, Zhang starred in the comedy youth film Young & Amazing. The same year, she starred in the war drama The Wolf Warriors.

In 2018, Zhang starred as the second female lead in the romance drama Here to Heart. She then co-starred in the hit palace drama Story of Yanxi Palace, portraying the Noble Lady Shun.

Personal life
Zhang is married to Mai Chao, a non-celebrity, with whom she has two children.

Filmography

Film

Television series

Discography

Awards

References

External links

1987 births
Actresses from Chengdu
Beijing Film Academy alumni
Living people
Singers from Chengdu
Chinese film actresses
Chinese television actresses
21st-century Chinese actresses
21st-century Chinese women singers